The 2024 United States House of Representatives elections in Indiana will be held on November 5, 2024, to elect the nine U.S. representatives from the State of Indiana, one from all nine of the state's congressional districts. The elections will coincide with the 2024 U.S. presidential election, as well as other elections to the House of Representatives, elections to the United States Senate, and various state and local elections.

District 1

The 1st district encompasses Northwest Indiana, taking in the eastern Chicago metropolitan area, including Hammond and Gary, as well as Lake County, Porter County and western LaPorte County. The incumbent is Democrat Frank Mrvan, who was elected with 52.8% of the vote in 2022.

Democratic primary

Candidates

Potential
Frank Mrvan, incumbent U.S. Representative

General election

Predictions

District 2

The 2nd district is located in north central Indiana taking in Michiana, including South Bend, Mishawaka, and Elkhart. The incumbent is Republican Rudy Yakym, who was elected with 64.6% of the vote in 2022.

Republican primary

Candidates

Potential
Rudy Yakym, incumbent U.S. Representative

General election

Predictions

District 3

The 3rd district includes all of Adams, Allen, Blackford, DeKalb, Huntington, LaGrange, Noble, Steuben, Wells and Whitley counties, as well as northern Jay and northeast Kosciusko counties.
The incumbent is Republican Jim Banks, who was re-elected with 65.3% of the vote in 2022. Banks is running for U.S. Senate.

Republican primary

Candidates

Declared
Wendy Davis, former Allen County circuit court judge
Mike Felker, maintenance technician and U.S. Army veteran
Andy Zay, state senator

Publicly expressed interest
Paul Helmke, former mayor of Fort Wayne and former president of the Brady Campaign
Marlin Stutzman, former U.S. Representative

Potential
Liz Brown, state senator and candidate in 2016
Justin Busch, state senator
Matt Kelty, architect, former aide to then-U.S. Senator Dan Coats, and nominee for mayor of Fort Wayne in 2007
Bob Morris, state representative
Tim Smith, Vincennes Fire Chief and nominee for mayor of Fort Wayne in 2019
Kip Tom, farmer and candidate in 2016

Declined
Jim Banks, incumbent U.S. Representative (running for U.S. Senate)

General election

Predictions

District 4

The 4th district is located in west-central Indiana taking in Lafayette and the western suburbs of Indianapolis. The incumbent is Republican Jim Baird, who was re-elected with 68.2% of the vote in 2022.

Republican primary

Candidates

Potential
Jim Baird, incumbent U.S. Representative

General election

Predictions

District 5

The 5th district encompasses the north side of Indianapolis as well as its eastern and northern suburbs, including Marion, Carmel, Anderson, Noblesville, Fishers, and parts of Kokomo. The incumbent is Republican Victoria Spartz, who was re-elected with 61.0% of the vote in 2022. Spartz is not running for re-election.

Republican primary

Candidates

Filed paperwork
Chuck Goodrich, state representative

Publicly expressed interest
Rodney Cummings, Madison County Prosecutor
Mario Massillamany, chair of the Hamilton County Republican Party
John Ruckelshaus, former state senator
Megan Savage, former chief of staff to then-U.S. Representative Susan Brooks

Potential
Scott Baldwin, state senator
Micah Beckwith, pastor and candidate in 2020
Brad Chambers, Indiana Secretary of Commerce (2021–present)
Mike Delph, former state senator
Beth Henderson, nurse and candidate in 2020
Chris Jensen, mayor of Noblesville
Chris Jeter, state representative
Elise Nieshalla, president of the Boone County Council and candidate for Indiana State Treasurer in 2022
Paul Wyman, former Howard County commissioner

Declined
Victoria Spartz, incumbent U.S. Representative

General election

Predictions

District 6

The 6th district is located in eastern and central Indiana including Columbus and Richmond, some of Cincinnati's Indiana suburbs, most of Indianapolis' southern suburbs, and a sliver of Indianapolis itself. The incumbent is Republican Greg Pence, who was re-elected with 67.5% of the vote in 2022.

Republican primary

Candidates

Potential
Greg Pence, incumbent U.S. Representative

General election

Predictions

District 7

The 7th district is entirely located within Marion County and includes most of Indianapolis, except for the southern side. The incumbent is Democrat André Carson, who was re-elected with 66.9% of the vote in 2022.

Democratic primary

Candidates

Potential
André Carson, incumbent U.S. Representative

General election

Predictions

District 8

The 8th district is located in southwest and west central Indiana, the district is anchored in Evansville and also includes Jasper, Princeton, Terre Haute, Vincennes and Washington. The incumbent is Republican Larry Bucshon, who was re-elected with 65.7% of the vote in 2022.

Republican primary

Candidates

Potential
Larry Bucshon, incumbent U.S. Representative

General election

Predictions

District 9

The 9th district is located in south-central and southeastern Indiana, the district stretches from the south suburbs of Indianapolis to the Indiana side of the Louisville metropolitan area. The incumbent is Republican Erin Houchin, who was elected with 63.6% of the vote in 2022.

Republican primary

Candidates

Potential
Erin Houchin, incumbent U.S. Representative

General election

Predictions

References

2024
Indiana
United States House of Representatives